George Stone  (born January 19, 1965) is a musician and educator. He had composed and arranged music for instrumental and vocal ensembles, with the bulk of his material for the big band format. He is best known for his 1990 MIDI composition CANYON.MID ("Trip Through the Grand Canyon"), which was included in the MEDIA directory in Microsoft Windows versions 3.0 with Multimedia Extensions to 2000.

Born and raised in Newhall, CA, George was a product of the local music programs and teachers of the Santa Clarita Valley. He graduated from Hart High School and received his degrees from Cal State University Northridge, where he was a member of the Jazz A-Band.

After graduation from Cal State Northridge he taught music at William S. Hart High School. A move to Cambria, CA, brought him to the music faculty at Cuesta College, San Luis Obispo, CA, where he currently teaches Audio Technology and Music Theory/Composition.

References

External links 
Monterey Next Generation Festival 2018  
Cuesta College Recording Program  

Living people
American educators
People from Newhall, Santa Clarita, California
1965 births